Golowan  (sometimes also Goluan or Gol-Jowan) is the Cornish language word for the Midsummer celebrations in Cornwall, UK; widespread prior to the late 19th century and most popular in the Penwith area and in particular Penzance and Newlyn. The celebrations were centred on the lighting of bonfires and fireworks and the performance of associated rituals. The midsummer bonfire ceremonies (Tansys Golowan in Cornish) were revived at St Ives in 1929 by the Old Cornwall Society and since then spread to other societies across Cornwall, as far as Kit Hill near Callington. Since 1991 the Golowan festival in Penzance has revived many of these ancient customs and has grown to become a major arts and culture festival; its central event 'Mazey Day' now attracts tens of thousands of people to the Penzance area in late June.

The 2021 Golowan Festival dates are 18 to 27 June with Mazey Day taking place on Saturday 26 June.

The historic festival

The ancient festival was first described by Dr William Borlase in 1754 in his book Antiquities of Cornwall:

Penzance 
The Penzance Golowan was one of the last examples of this practice in Cornwall until its prohibition by the Penzance Borough Council in the 1890s due to increased insurance premiums in the town and perceived fire risk. The celebrations themselves were centred on the lighting of fireworks, tar barrels, and torches on the evening of 23 June every year (St John's Eve). Towards the end of these festivities the local youths of the town would take part in the ancient serpent dance and jump or pass themselves through the dying embers of the flames. During these celebrations it was also usual to elect a Mock Mayor or Mayor of the Quay.
In 1864 it was recorded that the organising committee of the festival let off "258 dozen fire crackers and numerous Roman Candles, Jack-in-box and sky rockets" The day after these celebrations, a 'Midsummer's Day' fair took place on Penzance quay; boat rides and other entertainments were included in these celebrations.

Two descriptions of the fire festival in Victorian times follow below:

{{cquote|Then the villagers, linked in circles hand-in-hand, danced round them to preserve themselves against witchcraft, and when they burnt low, one person here and there detached himself from the rest and leaped through the flames to insure himself from some special evil. The old people counted these fires and drew a presage from them." At dusk the mayor of Penzance sent the town-crier through the streets to give notice that no fireworks were allowed to be let off in the town; but this was done simply that he should not be held responsible if any accident happened, for all in Penzance knew quite well that the law would be set at defiance. Large numbers of men women and boys came up soon after from the quay and lower parts of the town swinging immense torches around their heads; these were made of pieces of canvas about 2 feet square fastened in the middle either to a long pole or a strong chain, dipped until completely saturated in tar.Of course they required to be swung with great dexterity or the holder would have been burnt. The heat they gave out was something dreadful and the smoke suffocating."}}

 St Peter's Eve 

Porthleven and Newlyn in particular being centres for much of the celebration of St Peter's-tide because of St Peter's role as the patron saint of fishermen. St Peter's-tide is still celebrated in Porthleven however in a far more muted fashion Porthleven Petertide. M. A. Courtney in her book Cornish Feasts and Feasten Customs'' describes a delay to the Newlyn festivities in 1883 when the majority of the Newlyn fishing fleet were at sea, returning to celebrate the fire festival many days after the actual event. Mevagissey feast which occurs around St Peter's Eve continues to be celebrated.

St Just 
The people of St Just in Penwith had their own particular practices, Lake's Parochial history of Cornwall (1868) states:

Similar festivals 
Throughout Europe there are similar fire festivals held on 23 and 24 June. St. John's Eve in Ireland, Jāņi in Latvia and Saint Jonas' Festival are but a few examples. Golowan is just one example of a much wider Midsummer European tradition.

Modern Golowan celebrations 
The modern Golowan Festival in Penzance started in 1991 as an attempt to revive many of the traditions stated above. The core of the modern festival is long weekend which includes Mazey Eve, Mazey Day and Quay Fair Day. Thursday features a popular election of the 'Mayor of the Quay' and the Friday, Mazey Eve takes place around the harbour area of Penzance from where there is large firework display. The following day – Mazey Day is a large community and arts celebration. Schools, entertainers, community groups and others take part in a series of processions that include music, giant sculptures and variety of other artistic activities. Contributions from musicians and artists from the Celtic nations are a regular feature as are a variety of other musical contributions. Penzance itself during this day is decorated with large amounts of greenery – mirroring the practice in the town during the ancient festival. A large number of market stalls are also present throughout the town. Mazey Day attracts thousands of visitors to the area and has become an important symbol of the identity of town amongst local people. Quay Fair Day is a celebration that is similar in many ways to 'Midsummer Fair' described in the ancient festival with the addition of popular street entertainment.

In October 2015 Penzance Town Council outsourced the running of the festival to a not-for-profit community interest company, which, having run the festival successfully from 2016 to 2019, has now been contracted to run the Festival until 2021.

Penglaz the Penzance 'Obby 'Oss 

During the evening of Mazey Eve and on 23 June (St John's Eve) every year Penglaz the Penzance 'Obby 'Oss appears. Penglaz owes its origins to the descriptions of the hobby horse that once accompanied the Christmas guise dancers in their perambulation of Penzance during the nineteenth century. The classic, contemporary account of the guise dancers' horse was given by Richard Edmonds who described the horse as being:

The horse was a character associated with 'Old Penglaze' in the guise dancers' games of forfeiture, described by William Sandys:

Barbara Spooner in her work on the Padstow 'Obby 'Oss further describes the 'Obby 'Oss associated with "Old Penglaze".

Her description is of the 'mast' type of hobby horse, and Spooner followed Robert Morton Nance in expressing the view that 'the May day games and Morris Dances, with their own type of hobby-horse, which includes a rider, had been brought in from England too recently to have acquired Cornish names.'It became imperative amongst the Celtic Revivalists of the early twentieth century that the Tourney horse (with its rider) should be seen as English, or foreign, whereas the mast horses were to be understood as native, Celtic beasts, complete with Celtic names. In fact, as Edwin Cawte demonstrated in his study of British and European hobby horse practices, the mast type of horse developed during the eighteenth century and was particularly popular during the nineteenth, whereas the Tourney variety predated it by several centuries.

In his Cornish dictionary, Robert Morton Nance believed the character of Old Penglaze to be the horse and believed that Penglaze was a genuine Celtic noun for a hobby horse, something one of the above-mentioned quotations contradicts. Moreover, the writer of Bewnans Meriasek, the life of St. Meriasek (or Meriadoc) of Camborne, writing in Cornish, understood the hobby horse as feminine in gender, whereas Penglaze is masculine, potentially undermining its status as an example of Cornish language.

Regardless of the accuracy of its linguistic origins and accuracy of naming, etc., the modern Golowan festival's Penglaz takes its appearance from the later quotations descriptions and resembles strongly the Mari Lwyd of Welsh tradition and was first introduced in 1992 at the second revived Golowan festival by Merv Davey Hon piper of Gorseth Kernow. The original horse now forming part of Cornish music group Pyba's Guise dance programme being renamed "Penguise". The current "Oss" being used for the first time in 1993 .

Old Cornwall Society 

The ancient Golowan celebrations were also the inspiration for the Old Cornwall Societies' midsummer bonfire celebrations. The hilltop bonfires that form a chain are currently held at Kit Hill, St Breock beacon, Castle An Dinas, and Redruth.

See also 

Montol Festival
St. John's Eve
Midsummer
Allantide
Furry Dance
Tom Bawcock's Eve
Guise dancing
West Cornwall May Day celebrations
Halloween
 Feast of Saints Peter and Paul
 St Peter's Eve

References

External links 

 Official Website of the Golowan Festival
Detailed Description of the Ancient Golowan Festival
The 5.00 pm serpent dance on Mazey Day
 The Golowan Festival on Purely Penzance, including picture galleries
Mazey Day, Obby Oss and fireworks at the Penzance Golowan Festival (Eyewitness account of the celebration)

Cornish culture
Penzance
Newlyn
Festivals in Cornwall
June observances
Ritual animal disguise
Folk plays
Morris dance
Cornish festivals
Traditions involving fire
Saint John's Day